Grassington is a market town and civil parish in the Craven district of North Yorkshire, England. The population of the parish at the 2011 Census was 1,126. Nearby villages include Linton, Threshfield, Hebden, Conistone and Kilnsey.

History
The Domesday Book lists Grassington as part of the estate of Gamal Barn including 7 carucates of ploughland (840 acres/350ha) including Grassington, Linton and Threshfield.  The Norman conquest of England made it part of the lands of Gilbert Tison. But, by 1118, Tison had suffered a demotion and his lands returned to the king before being given to Lord Percy.

Originally the settlement was spelt as Gherinstone and also was documented as Garsington or Gersington. The name Grassington derives variously from the Scandinavian, Anglo-Saxon and Gothic languages, and means either the town of the grassy ings or a farmstead surrounded by grass.

Grassington was historically a township in the parish of Linton in the West Riding of Yorkshire.  It became a separate civil parish in 1866, and was transferred to North Yorkshire in 1974.

Although often described by local people as a village, Grassington was granted a Royal Charter for a market and fair in 1282 giving it market town status. The market was held regularly until about 1860. A change in land use from the early 17th century, when lead mining began to assume more importance and brought some prosperity, but Grassington's heyday arrived during the late 18th and early 19th centuries. The opening of the Yorkshire Dales Railway to Threshfield in 1902 brought new visitors, many of whom settled, some finding work in Skipton or in the developing limestone quarries. The Old Hall at Grassington is reputedly the oldest house in Yorkshire, dating from the late 13th or early 14th century.

Grassington & Threshfield Golf Club (now defunct) was founded in 1908. The club continued until the Second World War.

Grassington was used as the setting for the fictional town of Darrowby in the 2020 Channel 5 series All Creatures Great and Small, instead of Thirsk where the actual story took place; Thirsk had simply become too large for the small-town feel that the series wanted. 

Grassington worked well for filming. "The nice thing was that there weren’t any modern houses in the town center ... so we didn’t have to change anything completely. What we did change were all the shop signs and the usual things like aerials, satellite dishes, alarm boxes and all of those things".

A memorial of the trade unionist Tom Mann stands in front of the cottage where he died in Grassington.

Culture and community

Grassington is the main residential and tourist centre in Upper Wharfedale. Centred on its small cobbled square are shops, public houses, the village museum, small cafes, restaurants and hotels. Grassington Folk Museum houses a collection which tells the story of Wharfedale. It is an independent museum run and managed by volunteers.

The area is popular with walkers; one of the most popular routes is a circular walk that includes Burnsall. Upper Wharfedale Fell Rescue Association, based in Grassington, is a voluntary mountain rescue organisation which rescues people in trouble on the surrounding fells and in caves.

Grassington Festival is a two-week-long annual event started in 1980, with music, performance and visual arts, held in a number of venues around the village.

Every September since 2011, Grassington has held a 1940s themed weekend. Events include war re-enactments, dances and a variety of military and civilian vehicles on display from the period.

In the winter Grassington holds the Dickensian Festival, with period costumes, Christmas activities and commercial selling.

A Yorkshire Dales National Park information centre is on Hebden Road.

Three miles north of Grassington, at Kilnsey, is the glacially carved overhang of Kilnsey Crag.

The town was transformed into the fictional Darrowby for the filming of the 2020 television series of All Creatures Great and Small for Channel 5.

Transport
Grassington is served by the B6265, which runs between Skipton and Green Hammerton via Pateley Bridge and Boroughbridge (being a more circuitous route that the A59 road which connects Skipton and Green Hammerton). Buses connect Grassington with Ilkley and Skipton operating a moderate service to Skipton, but only a three-day a week service to Ilkley.

The DalesBus serves the community on certain days in summer; a report in August 2020 provided these specifics:"Grassington is served by daily bus service 72 from Skipton, with minibus 72B continuing further up Wharfedale to Kilnsey, Kettlewell and Buckden on Monday to Saturday. There are buses some days to Burnsall, Bolton Abbey and Ilkley. On Sundays, additional DalesBus services operate – including double-decker DalesBus 875 from Wakefield, Leeds and Ilkley to Grassington, Kettlewell and Buckden, continuing during the summer months to Aysgarth and Hawes in Wensleydale.

The town used to have a railway station terminus, which was shared with Threshfield, on the Yorkshire Dales Railway. The station was located on the west side of the River Wharfe, so it was not actually in Grassington. The line opened in July 1902 but closed down in September 1930 after only 28 years of service. The station remained open to freight and railtour traffic until 1969 when the tracks were removed to a point  to the south, at the limestone quarry at Swinden. Some of the quarry limestone continues to be transported by rail. The site of Grassington station is now a housing estate, but the Campaign for Better Transport have listed the Skipton to Grassington line as one which they wish to see re-opened to passenger traffic.

Education
Grassington has a Church of England primary school located in the town and there is another primary school in nearby Threshfield. Secondary education is either at the Upper Wharfedale School, which is a non-selective specialist sports college, or in Skipton at Ermysted's Grammar School (boys only) and Skipton Girls High School, both of which are selective.

Electricity generation

In 1909 Grassington received its first electricity from a hydroelectric plant at Linton Falls, which continued to operate until 1948 when the National Grid arrived in the area. In March 2012 a new hydroelectric power plant was opened using the same but restored turbine house, which provides 500,000 kWh of electricity a year, using two Archimedean screws.

References

External links

Map of the Grass Wood
Grassington Lead Mining Trail by Craven & Pendle Geological Society 
Lead mines – Meerstones of Grassington Moor 

 
Towns in North Yorkshire
Civil parishes in North Yorkshire
Craven District
Wharfedale